The sole qualification event for the canoe sprint events at the 2015 European Games will be the 2014 Canoe Sprint European Championships in Brandenburg 11–13 July 2014.

Qualification summary

Qualification rules
Each National Olympic Committee (NOC) is restricted to one boat per event, a maximum of fifteen boats, and therefore a maximum of 26 qualified athletes. Azerbaijan, as host, is guaranteed entry of three athletes, in three boats; K1-1000 metres and C1-1000 metres for men, and the K1-500 metres for women.

The bulk of qualification (all places other than host and 'universality' places) will be awarded by virtue of performance in the 2014 European Canoe Sprint Championships. Places will be awarded to NOCs rather than individual athletes. Each event has a quota of places available as set out below:

In the event an athlete qualifies in two boats (e.g. K1-1000m and K2-1000m), he or she will be allowed to compete in both events, but will only take up the quota place in the larger boat; the unused quota place in the smaller boat will then be redistributed. Where a boat qualifies in two events of the same boat size but over two distances (e.g. 200m and 1000m in K2), that boat will be allowed to compete in both events, but will only take up the quota place in the longer event; the unused quota place in the shorter event will then be redistributed. In both cases this will allow for more boats to compete in a particular event than there are quota places.

Qualified countries

Men's events

Women's events

 Host quota
 Italic: National federation has qualified a boat but the athlete that did this was already counted in another boat.

References

Qualification
Qualification for the 2015 European Games